The Llewellyn Formation is a mapped bedrock unit in eastern Pennsylvania. It was previously known as the "coal measures" and the post-Pottsville rocks. The formation is named for the community of Llewellyn in Schuylkill County.

Description
The Llewellyn is defined as a gray, fine- to coarse-grained sandstone, siltstone, shale, conglomerate, and anthracite coal in repetitive sequences. Although gray (light to dark) is the dominant color, other colors described include: buff, dark to light brown, and black.

Depositional environment
The Llewellyn was deposited upon a broad flat plain with sediment-choked rivers delivering detritus from the eroding uplands that were located to the southeast. Fluctuations in sea level, coupled with the shifting nature of the rivers and highlands, allowed dense forests to grow on the broad plain. As a result, a large amount of organic matter was buried and eventually turned to coal. The repetitive nature of these sediments have been well documented and are often called cyclothems.

Fossils
 Nearly 100 fossil species have been identified in the Llewellyn; almost all of them plants. The major divisions of flora that have been recognized include: Lycopodiophyta, Arthrophyta, Pteridophyta, and Pteridospermatophyta. Fossils have been recovered from every rock type in the Llewellyn but are predominantly found in the siltstone, shale, and coal layers. The compression fossils from the Llewellyn formation are well known for the striking white color on the dark stone. An important location for these fossils is near St. Clair, Pennsylvania.

Notable exposures
Bear Valley Strip Mine, located west of Shamokin in Northumberland County, Pennsylvania

Age
Relative and fossil age dating of the Llewellyn places it in the late-Middle to Late Pennsylvanian, being deposited between 308 and 300 (±1) million years ago. It was thought that the uppermost beds of the Llewellyn were of Permian in age, but no fossils have been found from that era. The bottom of the formation is placed either at the bottom of Buck Mountain (no. 5) coal bed or at the bottom of the underclay or shale bed below this coal measure. Since this is the last bed deposited in the Appalachian Basin in eastern Pennsylvania that still exists, only recent alluvial and colluvial deposits rest on top.

Economic use 
The economic gains of this formation have been exploited to their greatest potential in years past. The peak year of anthracite production was in 1917 when nearly 100 million tons were mined.  Anthracite production has declined every year since then. Recently, the old spoils of the mining operations (culm) have been refined to extract more coal for power production.

References

See also 
 Geology of Pennsylvania

Sandstone formations of the United States
Siltstone formations
Shale formations of the United States
Geologic formations of Pennsylvania
Paleontology in Pennsylvania
Carboniferous geology of Pennsylvania
Carboniferous southern paleotropical deposits